Meredith Curly Hunter, Jr. (October 24, 1951 – December 6, 1969), was an American man who was killed at the 1969 Altamont Free Concert. During the performance by the Rolling Stones, Hunter approached the stage, and was violently driven off by members of the Hells Angels Motorcycle Club who had agreed to serve as security guards. He subsequently returned to the stage area, drew a revolver, and was stabbed and beaten to death by Hells Angel Alan Passaro.

The incident was caught on camera and became a central scene in the Maysles Brothers documentary Gimme Shelter. Passaro was charged with murder and tried in 1971. Following 17 days of testimony, an eight-man, four-woman jury deliberated for 12 and a half hours before Passaro was acquitted on grounds of self-defense.

Altamont 

Hunter was an 18-year-old from Berkeley, California, nicknamed "Murdock" and described by friends as a flashy dresser with a big Afro. Hunter, his girlfriend Patty Bredehoft, Ronnie Brown (nicknamed "Blood"), and Brown's girlfriend Judy traveled from Berkeley to attend the Altamont Free Concert. His sister Dixie warned him about the still prevalent racism in the outer reaches of Alameda County, which prompted Meredith to take a .22 Smith and Wesson revolver for protection.

The Hells Angels had agreed to provide security for $500 (about US$3,830 adjusted for inflation, 2022) worth of beer. They stood directly in front of the bands in an effort to keep people off the unusually low stage, which had been set up at the bottom of a low slope. They parked several of their motorcycles in front of the stage to act "as a kind of bulwark against the crowd".

As the Hells Angels became intoxicated and the crowd became restless and unpredictable, the drunken Hells Angels began hurling full cans of beer from their stockpile and striking concertgoers with motorcycle chains and sawed-off, weighted pool cues to drive the crowd back from the stage and the Angels' motorcycles. By the time the Rolling Stones took the stage in the early evening, the mood had taken a decidedly ugly turn, as numerous fights began to erupt between Angels and crowd members. Denise Jewkes (née Kaufman) of local San Francisco rock band the Ace of Cups, six months pregnant at the time, was hit in the head by an empty beer bottle thrown from the crowd and suffered a skull fracture that warranted emergency surgery.

Lead singer Mick Jagger of the Rolling Stones (who had been punched by a concertgoer within seconds of emerging from the Stones' helicopter) urged the audience to "just be cool down in the front there, don't push around." Within the first minute of the Stones' third song, "Sympathy for the Devil", a fight erupted in the front of the crowd at the foot of the stage. After another appeal for calm, the band restarted the song and continued their set with fewer incidents until the start of "Under My Thumb". At this point, Hunter climbed on top of a speaker box next to the stage, and two of the Hells Angels got into a scuffle with Hunter. One of the Hells Angels grabbed Hunter's head, punched him, and chased him back into the crowd, where four Angels descended upon him.

After a few seconds, Hunter angrily returned to the front of the stage where, according to Gimme Shelter producer Porter Bibb, Hunter's girlfriend Patty Bredehoft found him and tearfully begged him to calm down and move farther back in the crowd with her. By her report he was enraged, irrational and "so high he could barely walk". Grateful Dead associate Rock Scully noticed Hunter in the crowd, concluding that “I saw what he was looking at, that he was crazy, he was on drugs, and that he had murderous intent. There was no doubt in my mind that he intended to do terrible harm to Mick or somebody in the Rolling Stones, or somebody on that stage." Another witness reported Hunter as looking "pretty straight", though visibly upset about the violence inflicted upon him.

Footage from the documentary shows Hunter, easily identifiable in a lime-green suit, drawing what appears to be a long-barreled blue steel .22 caliber revolver from his jacket and pointing it in the air. The film shows what might be an orange flash at the muzzle of the revolver in one frame. However, because of the film's low fidelity, it is impossible to determine whether the flash is a gunshot, a reflection or a film defect. The Angels did not report any discharged cartridges in Hunter's revolver. The film then shows Hells Angel Alan Passaro, armed with a knife, running at Hunter from the side, parrying the gun with his left hand and stabbing him with his right. Sources vary regarding which of the Maysles Brothers' camera operators shot the footage of the stabbing. Albert Maysles attributed it to cameraman Baird Bryant, while other sources have also credited Eric Saarinen.

In the film sequence, lasting about two seconds, a  opening in the crowd appears, leaving Patty Bredehoft in the center. Hunter enters the opening from the left, his hand rises and the silhouette of a revolver is clearly seen against Bredehoft's bright crocheted vest. Passaro is seen entering from the right and delivering two stabs as he pushes Hunter off screen. The opening closes around Bredehoft. Passaro was reported to have stabbed Hunter five times in the upper back. Witnesses also reported that Hunter was stomped on by several Hells Angels while he was on the ground. The gun was recovered and turned over to police. Hunter's autopsy later confirmed his girlfriend's report that he did have methamphetamine in his bloodstream at the time of his death.

Aftermath
Passaro was arrested and charged with murder for Hunter's death, but he was acquitted on grounds of self-defense after the jury viewed the footage from the concert showing Hunter drawing the revolver and pointing it toward the stage or in the air.

Over the years, there have been rumors that a second, unidentified assailant had inflicted the fatal wounds; as a result, the police considered the case still open. On May 25, 2005, the Alameda County Sheriff's Office announced that it was officially closing the case. Investigators, concluding a renewed two-year investigation, dismissed the theory that a second Hells Angel took part in the stabbing.

The Rolling Stones have stated that they were unaware that a killing had taken place during their set; in the Gimme Shelter documentary, Jagger notices the commotion in the crowd and threatens to end the performance until a stagehand pulls him aside and informs him about someone with a gun. The film then cuts to Jagger viewing raw footage of the killing, apparently for the first time. In 1995, Jagger commented on Hunter's death in an interview with Rolling Stone publisher Jann Wenner, who asked, "After the concert itself, when it became apparent that somebody got killed, how did you feel?" Jagger replied, "Well, awful. I mean, just awful. You feel a responsibility. How could it all have been so silly and wrong? But I didn't think of these things that you guys thought of, you in the press: this great loss of innocence, this cathartic end of the era ... I didn't think of any of that. That particular burden didn't weigh on my mind. It was more how awful it was to have had this experience and how awful it was for someone to get killed".

Shortly after Hunter's death, his mother, Altha May Anderson, requested that Altamont Raceway be turned into a public park to "prevent any more wrongful deaths at Altamont". Alameda County officials later voted to allow the raceway to continue to host races, but barred future concerts there and restricted the number of attendees to 3,000.

Passaro drowned in Anderson Lake in southern Santa Clara County on March 29, 1985; police said "the death is kind of suspicious", though foul play was never confirmed. He is buried at Los Gatos Memorial Park in San Jose, California.

In 2006, filmmaker Sam Green released a short documentary titled Lot 63, Grave C, which revolves around the last day of Hunter's life and the unmarked grave in which he was buried on December 10, 1969, at the Skyview Memorial Lawn cemetery in Vallejo. After the film was screened widely at film festivals, several people sent donations to the cemetery to buy Meredith Hunter a headstone, which was installed in 2008.

A documentary that aired on BBC in 2008 reported that, subsequent to the concert, members of the Hells Angels tried to murder Mick Jagger.

References

External links
 
 
 

1951 births
1969 deaths
Criminal trials that ended in acquittal
Deaths by stabbing in California
Filmed killings
Hells Angels
People from Berkeley, California
Deaths by person in California
The Rolling Stones
African-American history of California
20th-century African-American people